R. Subha is an Indian politician and incumbent Member of the Tamil Nadu Legislative Assembly from the Gangavalli constituency. She represents the Desiya Murpokku Dravidar Kazhagam party. She is from the Sarvaai Village, Tamil Nadu.

References 

Living people
Members of the Tamil Nadu Legislative Assembly
Desiya Murpokku Dravida Kazhagam politicians
21st-century Indian women politicians
21st-century Indian politicians
Year of birth missing (living people)
Women members of the Tamil Nadu Legislative Assembly